Al-Manifa is a mountain located 20 kilometers north of Ajnuna near Wadi al-Hrob in north western Saudi Arabia. On the basis that Hrob is a corruption of Horeb, in the early 20th century Alois Musil and H. Philby independently proposed that Al-Manifa was the Biblical Mount Sinai.

Manifa is having oil reserves of 11 billion barrels. Huge development work is in progress this area to support the extraction of oil.

References

Mountains of Saudi Arabia